The 2011 Canoe Slalom World Cup was a series of four races in five canoeing and kayaking categories organized by the International Canoe Federation (ICF). It was the 24th edition.

Calendar 

The series opened with World Cup Race 1 in Tacen, Slovenia (24–26 June) and ended with the World Cup Final in Prague, Czech Republic (12–14 August). The World Cup Final held a special status as the tie-breaker.

Final standings 

The winner of each race was awarded 60 points. Points for lower places differed from one category to another. Every participant was guaranteed at least two points for participation and five points for qualifying for the semifinal run. If two or more athletes or boats had the same number of points at the end of the series, the athletes or boats with the better result in the World Cup Final were awarded the higher position.

Results

World Cup Race 1 

The series opener took place in Tacen, Slovenia on 24–26 June. The five gold medals went to five different countries. Slovakia was the most successful country with a gold, a silver and three bronzes. The home nation won three medals, one of each color.

World Cup Race 2 

The second race of the series took place in L'Argentière-la-Bessée, France on 1–3 July. Slovakia was again the most successful country with two golds. The home team of France won one gold and one bronze medal.

World Cup Race 3 

The penultimate race of the series took place in Markkleeberg, Germany on 8–10 July. Michal Martikán and Tony Estanguet made their only appearance in the 2011 world cup season here. Slovakia won the medal table for the third consecutive time with three golds. Germany won one silver medal on home water.

World Cup Final 

The World Cup Final took place in Prague, Czech Republic on 12–14 August. The overall world cup winners for 2011 were determined here. Slovakia took the medal table for the fourth consecutive time with two golds and a silver. The home Czech paddlers managed to win one gold and two silvers.

References

External links 
 International Canoe Federation

Canoe Slalom World Cup
Canoe Slalom World Cup